Evelyn Station may refer to:

 Evelyn station, a former light rail station in Mountain View, California, United States
 Teal Inlet, once named Evelyn Station, a settlement in the Falkland Islands